Sangngagchhoeling Gewog (Dzongkha: གསང་སྔགས་ཆོས་གླིང་) is a gewog (village block) in Samtse District, Bhutan.

References

Gewogs of Bhutan
Samtse District